Yang Jinghui (born May 15, 1983 in Guangzhou, Guangdong) is a male Chinese diver who competed in the 2004 Summer Olympics. He started diving in 1992 and entered into the National Team in 2002. At 2004 Athens Olympic Games, he won the gold medal in the synchronized 10 metre platform competition together with Tian Liang. In 2005, Yang Jinghui retired due to serious shoulder injury.

References
 profile

1983 births
Living people
Chinese male divers
Divers at the 2004 Summer Olympics
Olympic divers of China
Olympic gold medalists for China
Sportspeople from Guangzhou
Hakka sportspeople
Hakka people
Olympic medalists in diving
Medalists at the 2004 Summer Olympics
Universiade medalists in diving
Universiade gold medalists for China
Medalists at the 2003 Summer Universiade
21st-century Chinese people
20th-century Chinese people